Citronelle is a city on the northern border of Mobile County, Alabama, United States. At the 2020 census, the population was 3,946.

History
The area was inhabited by indigenous peoples for thousands of years. By the time of European contact, the historic Choctaw and Creek people hunted in the area.

The first known European explorers of this area were French in the 18th century. They learned that the land had healing herbs and mineral springs. The area was settled in 1811 and established as a jurisdiction (incorporated) in 1892. The name "Citronelle" is French and is derived from the citronella plant. In the late 19th century, the town became a popular resort destination because of the climate, herbs, and healing waters. Many hotels were built to accommodate the surge of visitors.

On May 4, 1865, one of the last significant Confederate armies was surrendered by Lieutenant General Richard Taylor under the "Surrender Oak". This was the third in the series of five major surrenders of armies that ended the war. The two previous surrenders occurred at Appomattox Court House, Virginia, between Confederate General Robert E. Lee and US General Ulysses S. Grant; and the second and largest at Bennett Place near Durham, North Carolina between US General William T. Sherman and Confederate General Joseph E. Johnston.

A living history/reenactment of the surrender occurs each year in Citronelle. The historic "Surrender Oak" no longer stands, as it was destroyed by a hurricane in 1902.

In 1955, oil was discovered in the area. Today Citronelle is known as the oil capital of Alabama.

Geology
Citronelle developed on what is known as the Citronelle Dome, a salt dome formation that is still rising, as shown by the radial drainage of streams away from the center. In 1955 oil was discovered in this geologic structure at a greater depth than had previously been considered as feasible. The Citronelle Dome was developed as among the first of many "deep" oil fields.

"Citronelle Dome is a giant salt-cored anticline in the eastern Mississippi Interior Salt Basin of southwest Alabama. The dome forms an elliptical structural closure containing multiple opportunities for enhanced oil recovery (EOR) and saline reservoir CO2 sequestration.

Geography
The northern border of the city is at the Washington County line. U.S. Route 45 runs from north to south through the city, to the west of the downtown area.

Demographics

2020 census

As of the 2020 United States census, there were 3,946 people, 1,412 households, and 1,021 families residing in the city.

2010 census
As of 2010 Citronelle had a population of 3,905.  The racial and ethnic composition of the population was 70.7% white, 20.2% black or African American, 4.9% Native American, 0.5% Asian, 1.5% from some other race, 2.2% reporting two or more races and 2.6% Hispanic or Latino from any race.

2000 census
As of the census of 2000, there were 3,659 people, 1,318 households, and 1,009 families residing in the city. The racial makeup of the city was 76.96% White, 18.61% Black or African American, 2.76% Native American, 0.14% Asian, 0.03% Pacific Islander, 0.25% from other races, and 1.26% from two or more races. 0.82% of the population were Hispanic or Latino of any race.

There were 1,318 households, out of which 38.3% had children under the age of 18 living with them, 57.2% were married couples living together, 15.0% had a female householder with no husband present, and 23.4% were non-families. 22.3% of all households were made up of individuals, and 10.8% had someone living alone who was 65 years of age or older. The average household size was 2.73 and the average family size was 3.19.

In the city, the population was spread out, with 28.3% under the age of 18, 9.9% from 18 to 24, 26.9% from 25 to 44, 21.7% from 45 to 64, and 13.1% who were 65 years of age or older. The median age was 35 years. For every 100 females, there were 90.9 males. For every 100 females age 18 and over, there were 87.7 males.

The median income for a household in the city was $31,739, and the median income for a family was $39,922. Males had a median income of $32,200 versus $19,702 for females. The per capita income for the city was $16,455. About 12.0% of families and 15.4% of the population were below the poverty line, including 21.1% of those under age 18 and 19.1% of those age 65 or over.

Education
The city is served by the Mobile County Public School System and has the following public schools: McDavid-Jones Elementary School (K-5), Lott Middle School (6-8), and Citronelle High School (9-12).

Notable people
 Bama Rowell, former professional baseball player, was born and raised here. Living in Citronelle throughout his adult life, he played for the Boston Braves and the Philadelphia Phillies.

See also

2016 Citronelle homicides

References

External links

Citronelle Historical Preservation Society

1811 establishments in Alabama
Cities in Alabama
Cities in Mobile County, Alabama
Populated places established in 1811